Resister may refer to:

somebody who resists, like a war, tax, or draft resister
Resister (album), an album by The Decline
Resister (song), a song by Japanese singer ASCA

See also 
Resistor, a common electronic component